The Building of the Boat was a projected Wagnerian opera for soloists, chorus, and orchestra that occupied the Finnish composer Jean Sibelius from 8 July 1893 to late-August 1894, at which point he abandoned the project. The piece was to have been a collaboration with the Finnish author , whose libretto (joint with Sibelius) adapted Runos VIII and XVI of the Kalevala, Finland's national epic. In the story, the wizard Väinämöinen tries to seduce the moon goddess Kuutar by building a boat with magic; his incantation is missing three words, and he journeys to the underworld of Tuonela to obtain them.

In July 1894, Sibelius attended Wagner festivals in Bayreuth and Munich. His enthusiasm for his own opera project waned as his attitude towards the German master turned ambivalent and, then, decisively hostile. Instead, Sibelius began to identify as a "tone painter" in the Lisztian mold, and subsequently reworked most of 's material into 1895's The Wood Nymph (Op. 15) and 1896's The Lemminkäinen Suite (Op. 22)—most notably, the opera's overture evolved into The Swan of Tuonela. Sibelius never again attempted a large-scale opera, making it one of the few genres in which he did not produce a viable work.

History
From the 1870s to the 1890s, the politics of Finland featured a struggle between the Svecomans and the Fennomans. Whereas the former sought to preserve the privileged position of the Swedish language, the latter desired to promote Finnish as a means of inventing a distinctive national identity. High on the "agenda" for the Fennomans was to develop vernacular opera, which they "understood as a symbol of a proper nation"; to do so, they would need a permanent company with an opera house and a Finnish-language repertoire at its disposal. Swedish-speaking Helsinki already had a permanent theatre company housed at the Swedish Theatre, and thanks to Fredrik Pacius, two notable, Swedish-language operas: King Charles's Hunt (1852) and The Princess of Cyprus (1860). Success was hard-won: in 1872, the Fennoman Kaarlo Bergbom founded the Finnish Theatre Company, and a year later it named its singing branch the Finnish Opera Company. This was a small group that, without an opera house as residence, toured the country performing "the best of the foreign repertoire", albeit translated into Finnish. However, the Fennomans still remained without an opera written to a Finnish libretto, and in 1879 the Finnish Opera Company folded due to financial difficulties.

Acting as a catalyst, in 1891 the Finnish Literature Society organized a competition that provided domestic composers with the following brief: submit before the end of 1896 a Finnish-language opera about Finland's history or mythology; the winning composer and librettist receive 2000 and 400 markka, respectively. Sibelius had seemed an obvious candidate to inaugurate a new vernacular era, given his role in the 1890s as an artist at the center of the nationalist cause in Finland: first, he had married into an aristocratic family identified with the Finnish resistance; second, he had joined the Päivälehti circle of liberal artists and writers; and third, he had become the darling of the Fennomans with his Finnish-language masterpiece Kullervo, a setting of The Kalevala for soloists, male choir, and orchestra. The competition was the "initial impulse" for The Building of the Boat, the 1893–1894 project in which Sibelius had aspired to write a mythological, Finnish-language  on the subject of Väinämöinen. But Sibelius's opera foundered on the shoals of self-doubt and artistic evolution. In the end, the Society received no submissions, and when Sibelius finally emerged with his first opera, it was 1896's The Maiden in the Tower to a Swedish libretto.

Notes, references, and sources

Notes

References

Sources

Further reading

Compositions by Jean Sibelius
Operas
Unfinished operas